Goboat  is a Danish developer and operator of solar energy-powered, picnic boats. The company opened its first terminal at Islands Brygge in Copenhagen in 2014.

Design
The company is founded by Carl Kai Rand, architect and Boatdesigner, Kasper Højer Romme and Anders Mørk. The concept is centred on eco-friendly principles. The boats are built out of recycled plastic from cola bottles and a later version will be built out of decommissioned windmills. Norwegian wood company Kebony has delivered sustainable wood for the Goboat terminal, the floating pier and the boats themselves. The solar-powered rental terminal is developed by Gaia Solar.

Concept
The boats fits up to eight people around a picnic table and their navigation requires no previous experience with sailing. A boat can sail up to 12 hours on one charge. It is also possible to buy picnic baskets at the terminal.

References

External links
 Official website

Port of Copenhagen
Transport in Copenhagen
Tourist attractions in Copenhagen
Water transport in Denmark